Greidinger is a surname. Notable people with the surname include: 

Dahlia Greidinger (1926–1979), Israeli scientist
Mooky Greidinger (born 1952), Israeli businessman, CEO of Cineworld